Tukde Tukde Gang is a pejorative political catchphrase used in India by the Bharatiya Janata Party (BJP) and accusing their critics for allegedly supporting sedition and secessionism. Whereas the words tukde-tukde refer to "breaking or cutting something into small fragments", the phrase "tukde tukde gang" can be translated as "a gang that wants to divide the country". The phrase is used  by  BJP leadership, and some news channels to stigmatize political opponents who have different political views.

Usage 
Sudhir Chaudhary, the ex-editor-in-chief of Zee TV (currently Consulting Editor of Aaj Tak), took credit for coining the term. According to him, it was targeted at "designer journalists", and "English-speaking page 3 celebrities" who allegedly "sympathise with terrorists" and "malign the judicial system". Shivam Vij credited Republic TV's Arnab Goswami for having popularised the term as a device to club together all the Left-liberal critics of the government and painting them as anti-nationals who allegedly wanted to see India broken to pieces.

The term was popularised during the 2016 JNU sedition row. Then it was used to brand the left-leaning students of the Jawaharlal Nehru University  that protested the hanging of Afzal Guru, who was convicted for aiding terrorists. In a cellphone video that emerged after the protests, some protesters were heard shouting anti-national slogans such as "Bharat tere tukde honge" (India, you will be divided into pieces). Some students, including Kanhaiya Kumar and Umar Khalid, were arrested under charges of sedition and later released on bail for six months.

Since then, numerous senior members of the Bharatiya Janta Party (BJP) have used the phrase multiple times, including the Prime Minister Narendra Modi, Home Minister Amit Shah, Law and Justice Minister Ravi Shankar Prasad and MoS External Affairs S. Jaishankar. In December 2019, Shah, while addressing a gathering in Delhi, described people protesting the recent Citizenship Amendment act as "tukde tukde gang" and said that they needed to be punished. In a February 2022 speech to parliament, Modi stated that Indian National Congress was the leader of Tukde Tukde Gang and had been practicing a divide and rule policy.

Criticism 
An RTI request was filed in the Ministry of Home Affairs headed by Amit Shah, querying the particulars of the "tukde tukde gang" and whether it was banned under the Unlawful Activities Prevention Act (UAPA). In its reply on 20 January 2020, the Ministry said it had "no information concerning tukde-tukde gang." Yashwant Sinha, former  Minister of Finance and External Affairs under PM Atal Bihari Vajpayee said, the real tukde-tukde gang are the one who are in the BJP indicating to Modi and Shah. Historian Ramachandra Guha said the real tukde-tukde gang are those, who are sitting in Delhi who want to divide the country on the basis of religion and languages while he was detained by police during CAA-NRC protest. P. Chidambaram, the former Minister of Finance under PM Manmohan Singh, said that the "real tukde tukde gang" is the ruling party which is determined to divide the country on religious lines. He criticised the comment of Ravi Shankar Prasad, the sitting Law Minister of India, for calling protesters as a part of tukde tukde gang. Talking to the National Herald (India), Kanhaiya Kumar, on whom the BJP Government registered a seditious case, said that the BJP government has been using, the imaginary “tukde tukde gang” to deflect public attention from the real issues of unemployment, economy and education.

See also 

 Anti-national (India)

References

Bibliography

 Time to punish 'tukde-tukde' gang for violence in Delhi: Shah attacks Cong, AAP, The Asian Age, 26 December 2019.
 Most dangerous tukde tukde gang in India consists of only two people, and they are both in BJP: Yashwant Sinha, Kerala Kaumudi, 27 December 2019.
 “Will Punish The Tukde-Tukde Gang”, Says India’s Union Home Minister Amit Shah, metrosaga, 27 December 2019.
 Didn’t encounter any tukde-tukde gang at JNU: S Jaishankar recalls student days, India TV, 6 January 2020.
 Tukde-tukde on Shah’s lips, The Telegraph, 7 January 2020.
 Nikhil Naz, Will The Real 'Tukde-Tukde Gang' Please Stand Up?, NDTV, 7 January 2020.
 Boycott Deepika, her movies over support to tukde tukde gang: BJP MP, The Indian Express, 9 January 2020.
 'Stood With People Who Say Bharat Tere Tukde Honge': Smriti Irani Slams Deepika Padukone, Outlook, 10 January 2020.
 ‘Won’t stand behind Tukde Tukde gang’: Kangana to Deepika, The Siasat Daily, 17 January 2020.
 Tukde-tukde gang does exist, they are running govt: Shashi Tharoor, Deccan Herald, 21 January 2020.
 Amit Shah’s ‘tukde tukde gang’ barb is a sign of his desperation: Kanhaiya Kumar, National Herald, 23 January 2020.
 Tricolour is a cover for tukde-tukde gang: Prasad, BusinessLine, 27 January 2020.
 There is no info on 'tukde tukde gang' admits home ministry, contradicts Modi, Amit Shah, The Week, 20 January 2020.
 We don’t have information about ‘tukde-tukde gang’, home ministry says in reply to RTI query, Scroll.in, 20 January 2020.
 Home Ministry Confirms It Has No Information On ‘Tukde Tukde’ Gang, Activist To Explore Legal Options, Outlook, 21 January 2020.
 In Response to RTI, MHA Says It Has No Information About 'Tukde Tukde Gang', The Wire, 21 January 2020.
 Nivedita Menon, From 'Tukde Tukde Gang' To Saffronisation Of Faculty, Attacks On JNU Part Of 'Hindu Rashtra' Agenda, Outlook, 20 January 2020.
 Tukde Tukde gang in Bollywood too: UP Minister, Telangana Today, 24 January 2020.
 Shaheen Bagh offering platform to 'tukde tukde' gang under garb of opposing citizenship Act, alleges Ravi Shankar Prasad, FirstPost, 27 January 2020.
 ‘Shaheen Bagh protest is a platform for tukde-tukde gang’, The Hindu, 28 January 2020.
 Ronojoy Sen, The Standoff Between India’s Government and Its Protesters Can Only Be Broken by Elections, Foreign Policy, 28 January 2020.
 BJP govt has become tukde-tukde gang, is partitioning Indian soul: Tharoor, Business Standard, 4 February 2020.
 India Ka DNA Conclave 2020: 'Kejriwal's patriotism lies with Tukde-Tukde gang' says Manoj Tiwari, Zee News,
 BJP ends campaign with Shaheen Bagh rhetoric, Millennium Post, 6 February 2020.

External links
 Yes, I am from the 'tukde tukde gang', says Kanhaiya Kumar, The Week, 9 January 2020.
 Satish Padmanabhan, Satire | ‘Are You From The Tukde Tukde Gang Or The Khan Market Gang?’, Outlook, 10 January 2020.

Political neologisms
Propaganda in India
Right-wing politics in India
Godi media